PIE (Pinoy Interactive Entertainment), also known on-air as PIE Channel, is a Philippine free-to-air television channel co-owned by ABS-CBN Corporation (operates as its main content provider), Kroma Entertainment and 917Ventures, in partnership with Broadcast Enterprises and Affiliated Media. The name is derived after Pie, a baked pastry dish made of dough casing that contains various sweet or savory filling ingredients, which consists of different traditional and digital (known as "tradigital") entertainment programs for games, talk and variety shows mixed with real-time interaction format that can be viewed at any devices, dubbed as the country's first multiscreen and real-time interactive entertainment channel. It broadcast nationwide on television via digital terrestrial through BEAM TV on its flagship station Channel 31, cable and satellite providers, as well as worldwide via online through PIE's YouTube channel, its official website and GCash's GLife (since May 28, 2022), which operates daily from 7:00 a.m. to 12:00 midnight (except Holy Week yearly where it signs off from Maundy Thursday until Black Saturday).

Background and history
On April 6, 2022, Ayala Corporation-owned Globe Telecom ventured into media and entertainment industry by launching a multi-platform innovative tradigital entertainment company, Kroma Entertainment (formerly Sphere Entertainment) through 917Ventures Retirement Fund, which primarily owns Anima and Upstream PH. On the same day, Kroma Entertainment announced its co-ownership with ABS-CBN for its new offering Pinoy Interactive Entertainment or PIE, with ABS-CBN served as its main content productions provider while Kroma Entertainment as its technological innovative interaction format backed by 917Ventures, and can be accessible to reach 11 million households in partnership with Broadcast Enterprises and Affiliated Media for digital terrestrial broadcast and 85 million digitally-connected online users.

It started its test broadcast on April 25, 2022, showcasing unprompted daily questions each day until May 15, followed by a seven-day "Countdown to TagumPIE" special on May 16–22, and made its official launch on May 23, 2022. Following the implementation of changes in PIE Channel's programming on September 12, 2022, the channel has been made available to international viewers through its YouTube channel.

Programming

Programming blocks
The programming is divided into various programming blocks:

Current
 Barangay PIE Silog (a consolidation of PIE Silog and Barangay PIE) – the channel's lifestyle and public service block. From September to December 2022, it formerly aired live from 10:00 a.m. to 12:00 p.m. As of January 2, 2023, it airs replay episodes from 7:00 a.m. to 9:00 a.m.
 Barangay PIE – the channel's off-centered news and human interest block. From May to August 2022, it formerly aired live from 11:30 a.m. to 3:00 p.m. As of January 2, 2023, it airs replay episodes from 9:00 a.m. to 11:00 a.m.
 PIEnalo (formerly PIEnalo: Pinoy Games) – the channel's instant wins and recognition block. Since January 2, 2023, it currently airs from 6:30 p.m. to 9:00 p.m. on weekdays. On weekends since January 28, 2023, this block is branded as 'Sang Daang PIEnalo which airs from  6:00 p.m. to 7:30 p.m. on Saturdays, and from  6:15 p.m. to 9:00 p.m. on Sundays.
 PIE Night Long – the channel's talk, narrative, and music block. From May to December 2022, it formerly aired live from 9:30 p.m. to 12:00 m.n. As of January 2, 2023, it airs replay episodes from 10:00 p.m. to 12:00 m.n. on weeknights.

Former
 PIE Silog – the channel's morning lifestyle and music block. It formerly aired from 5:00 a.m. to 11:30 a.m.
 PIE Borito – the channel's anthology, drama, romance, and music block. It formerly aired from 11:00 a.m. to 4:00 p.m.
 PIE Galingan – the channel's unique talent variety block. it formerly aired from 4:30 p.m. to 6:30 p.m. on weekdays and from 4:00 p.m. to 6:00 p.m. on Saturdays.

Current programs

Block-exclusive

Barangay PIE Silog
 Dr. Care
 Eto Na Nga
 Life Guro
 Pasok Mga Suki
 Sumpungan HQ

PIE Borito
 The Chosen One Catch-up
 Playlist Natin
 Dream Maker Catch-up
 The Better Half
 Got to Believe

PIE Galingan Weekend
 Papa ng Masa

PIEnalo
 Dagdag Bawas
 Matching Matching
 Pasa o Bayong

'Sang Daang PIEnalo
 Pera o Bayong (PoB)
 Sino'ng Manok Mo?

PIE Night Long
 Basta Ka-Feeling Ka
 PNL Sessions
 Uzi
 Uzi News
 Uzi Report
 Uzi Moments

Non-block exclusive
 Dream Maker: Pause and Play
 The Chosen One
 The Chosen One Barkadahan
 Pak na Pak! Palong Follow
 Playlist
 PIE Shorts
 Eat Pay Love
 Cool Off

Upcoming programs

Non-block exclusive
 The Chosen One

Former programs

Block-exclusive

PIE Silog
 Almusal All G
 G Tayo
 Gscovery
 Stalk

Barangay PIE
 Barangay PIE Clearance
 Barangayan
 Lokal
 Oohlascope
 Oohlat
 Oohlat Weather
 Sumpungan
 Team Slapsoil
 Slapsoil D.I.Y.
 Slapsoil Kusina
 Slaptrip
 Umpukan
 Wanted Tanod
 Balita Now

PIE Borito
 Best of Barangay PIE
 PIE Extra Slice
 Uzi Presents: Iba
 On the Wings of Love

PIE Galingan
 BB Gurlz: The Search for the PIEbansang Girl Group
 Best of Ekstra Ordinaryo
 Bida Body Part
 Ekstra Ordinaryo
 Ekstra Ordinaryo: Next Level
 Galing Reveal
 Nu Ginagawa Mo?
 PIE Exam
 PIE Game

PIEnalo/PIEnalo: Pinoy Games
 Palong Follow
 Pera o Bayong (PoB)
 PoB Jackpot
 PoB: Sana All
 Swerteng Sulpot

PIE Night Long
 How To Be U?
 Moments
 Connecting Moments
 Hu-Quote Of The Night
 Moment Mo
 PIE Night Out
 Tender, Love & Karen

Non-block exclusive
 Pak! Palong Follow
 Pera o Bayong (PoB)
 PoB Bonus
 PoB Pambato
 Swerteng Sulpot Jr.

Hosts
The following list are well-known celebrities and online influencers that served as the channel hosts in their respective programming blocks, dubbed as "PIE Jocks":

Barangay PIE Silog
 Migs Bustos 
 Frances Cabatuando (Mayora) 
 Nicole Cordoves 
 Gretchen Fullido
 Daisy Lopez (Madam Inutz) 
 Omar Punzalan (Mayor TV) 
 Tristan Ramirez 
 Abby Trinidad

Pak na Pak! Palong Follow
 Vivoree Esclito
 Jeremy Glinoga
 Gello Marquez
 Gabb Skribikin
 Luke Alford

PIE Galingan Weekend
 Anji Salvacion 
 Sheena Belarmino 
BB Gurlz 
 Freshe
 Dyanne
 Ayumi
 Gigi
 Angelica

PIEnalo
 Enzo Almario 
 Nonong Ballinan
 Samantha Bernardo 
 Melai Cantiveros
 Jackie Gonzaga 
 Uldario Molina, Jr. (Negi)
 Kevin Montillano
 Nicki Morena
 Eric Nicolas 
 Ruth Paga 
 Eian Rances
 Patsy Reyes 
 Alora Sasam 
 Zendee 
 Jolina Magdangal

Dream Maker: Pause & Play
 DJ Jhai Ho
 Gabb Skribikin
 Sela Guia

The Chosen One Barkadahan
 Luke Alford
 Rob Blackburn
 Seham Daghlas
 Zach Guerrero
 Dustine Mayores
 Emjay Savilla
 Gabb Skribikin
 Maxine Trinidad
 Amanda Zamora

PIE Night Long
 Karen Bordador
 Reneé Dominique 
 Vivoree Esclito 
 Elmo Magalona 
 Aaron Maniego

Relief/Guest PIE Jocks
 Divine Tetay
 Anthony Barion
 Turs Daza
 Lucas Garcia
 Albie Casiño
 Karina Bautista
 Gillian Vicencio
 Kerwin King
 Gino Roque
 Kiara Takahashi
 Pretty Trizsa
 Benedix Ramos
 Argel Saycon
 Anthony Jennings
 TJ Valderrama
 Jin Macapagal
 Elyson De Dios
 Brenda Mage
 Shanaia Gomez
 Gail Banawis
 Quincy Villanueva
 JC Alcantara
 AC Bonifacio
 Awra Briguela
 Cianne Dominguez
 Kaila Estrada
 Andrea Abaya
 Kobie Brown
 Igiboy Flores
 Criza Taa

Unassigned
 Eris Aragoza 
 Janine Berdin 
 Coco Cordero 
 Inah Evans 
 Eryka Lucas 
 Ralph Malibunas 
 Iyah Mina 
 Jae Miranda 
 Reign Parani 
 Ryan Morales Reyes (Ninong Ry) 
 Raco Ruiz 
 Sunshine Teodoro 
 Kid Yambao 
 Jhong Hilario

See also
 CgeTV (a similar interactive channel of ABS-CBN on 2010–2012)
 Myx
 Studio 23

Notes

References

External links
 

ABS-CBN Corporation channels
2022 establishments in the Philippines
Filipino-language television stations
Television networks in the Philippines
Television channels and stations established in 2022